The 1991 All-Ireland Senior Camogie Championship Final was the sixtieth All-Ireland Final and the deciding match of the 1991 All-Ireland Senior Camogie Championship, an inter-county camogie tournament for the top teams in Ireland.

Kilkenny won by seven points, to complete a seven-in-a-row.

References

All-Ireland Senior Camogie Championship Finals
All-Ireland Senior Camogie Championship Final
All-Ireland Senior Camogie Championship Final
All-Ireland Senior Camogie Championship Final, 1991